Centre Wellington District High School, or CWDHS, is a fully composite high school located in Fergus, Ontario. 
The school was originally called Fergus High School and was constructed in 1928. Later, two additions were built, but eventually, the number of students exceeded the capacity of the building.  As a result, a brand new school was built which opened in September 2004. It is run by the Upper Grand District School Board. The principal of the school is Janine Grin; the school's vice principals are Kevin Taylor and Lynne Vink.

The school's educational philosophy is centered on three core principles: learning, respect, and community.

Curriculum

Departments

The CWDHS curriculum comprises several phantasmagorical departments:
The Arts (Drama, Music, Media Arts https://web.archive.org/web/20110807124509/http://www.ugdsb.on.ca/cwdhs/mediaarts/ and Fine Arts)
Business Studies
English
Social Sciences (Geography, History and Family Studies)
International Languages (French and Spanish)
Mathematics
Science
Physical Education
Technological Studies
Computer Technology (Skills Canada Ontario Champions, ICTC CyberTitan National Finalists)

Athletic program 
Similar to most high schools, CWDHS has a vast extracurricular athletic program in which teams composed of students travel to surrounding schools to compete. The school is particularly strong in distance running, rugby and wrestling, having heralded several provincial and national champions in these sports.
Sports include the following:
Alpine Skiing Team
Badminton
Basketball
Cross Country
Curling
Field Hockey
Ice Hockey
Rugby
Softball
Soccer
Swimming
Tennis
Track & Field
Ultimate Frisbee
Volleyball
Wrestling

CWDHS plays in the very competitive District 10 of CWOSSA (Central Western Ontario Secondary Sports Association).  District 10 is made of up of high schools in Wellington County, the city of Guelph, Dufferin County and their outlying areas.

R.A.R.A. 
At CWDHS, an innovative program coined "R.A.R.A." (Read Anywhere, Read Anytime) involves every student and staff member taking 20 minutes out of each day (except Friday) to read.  It commenced in September 2005.

The program was initiated to encourage reading and increase literacy in students.

This program ceased to be followed in 2015.

Extracurricular activities and clubs 
Amnesty International
Anime Club
Astronomy Club
Athletic Council
Band & Choir
Computer Club
Drama (several school plays/musical held annually)
Environment Club
Falconstock
Gay-Straight Alliance
Games Club
Guitar Club
History Club (now defunct)
Improv Club
Knitting Club
Martial Arts Club
Meditation Club
Mountain Bike Club
Philosophy Club (now defunct)
Quilting Club
Reach For The Top (also known as "School Reach") (now defunct)
Ski & Snowboard Club
Students' Council
Swordsmen Club (Larping, now exeunt)
Stage Crew
Yoga club

See also
List of high schools in Ontario

References

External links 
 CWHDS Website

Educational institutions established in 1928
High schools in Wellington County, Ontario
Centre Wellington
1928 establishments in Ontario